Limiao (李庙) may refer to:

Limiao, Hubei, a town in Nanzhang County, Hubei, China
Limiao Township, a township in Shangluo, Shaanxi, China

See also
Li Miao (disambiguation) for people